Fire Island is the large center island of the outer barrier islands parallel to the South Shore of Long Island, in the U.S. state of New York.

Occasionally, the name is used to refer collectively to not only the central island, but also Long Beach Barrier Island, Jones Beach Island, and Westhampton Island, since the straits that separate these islands are ephemeral. In 2012, Hurricane Sandy once again divided Fire Island into two islands.

Fire Island is part of Suffolk County. It lies within the towns of Babylon, Islip, and Brookhaven, containing two villages and a number of hamlets. All parts of the island not within village limits are part of the Fire Island census-designated place (CDP), which had a permanent population of 292 at the 2010 census, though that expands to thousands of residents and tourists during the summer months.

History

Etymology
The origin of Fire Island's name is not certain. The Secatogues were a tribe in the area of the current town of Islip. It was part of what was also called the "Seal Islands".

The name of Fire Island first appeared on a deed in 1789.

Historian Richard Bayles suggested that the name derives from a misinterpretation or corruption of the Dutch word  ('five'), or in another version  ('four'), referring to the number of islands near the Fire Island inlet, a view echoed by Robert Caro, who suggest in The Power Broker that the island was named to reflect four inlets which have since disappeared. At times histories have referred to it in the plural, as "Fire Islands", because of the inlet breaks.

Other versions say the island derived its name from fires built on the sea's edge by Native Americans or by pirates to lure unsuspecting ships into the sandbars. Some say it is how portions of the island look to be on fire from sea in autumn. Yet another version says it comes from the rash caused by poison ivy on the island.

While the western portion of the island was referred to as Fire Island for many years, the eastern portion was referred to as Great South Beach until 1920, when widespread development caused the whole land mass to be called Fire Island.

Settlement

Indigenous Native Americans lived on what are known today as Long Island and Fire Island for many centuries before Europeans arrived. There exists a myth that the islands were occupied by "thirteen tribes" "neatly divided into thirteen tribal units, beginning with the Canarsie who lived in present-day Brooklyn and ending with the Montauk on the far eastern end of the island." Modern ethnographic research indicates, however, that before the European invasion, Long Island and Fire Island were occupied by "indigenous groups [...] organized into village systems with varying levels of social complexity. They lived in small communities that were connected in an intricate web of kinship relations [...] there were probably no native peoples living in tribal systems on Long Island until after the Europeans arrived. [...] The communities appear to have been divided into two general culture areas that overlapped in the area known today as the Hempstead Plains [...]. The western groups spoke the Delaware-Munsee dialect of Algonquian and shared cultural characteristics such as the longhouse system of social organization with their brethren in what is now New Jersey and Delaware. The linguistic affiliation of the eastern groups is less well understood [...] Goddard [...] concluded that the languages here are related to the southern New England Algonquian dialects, but he could only speculate on the nature of these relationships [...]. Working with a few brief vocabulary lists of Montauk and Unquachog, he suggested that the Montauk might be related to Mohegan-Pequot and the Unquachog might possibly be grouped with the Quiripi of western Connecticut. The information on the Shinnecock was too sparse for any determination [...] The most common pattern of indigenous life on Long Island prior to the intervention of the whites was the autonomous village linked by kinship to its neighbors."

"Most of the 'tribal' names with which we are now familiar do not appear to have been recognized by either the first European observers or by the original inhabitants until the process of land purchases began after the first settlements were established. We simply do not know what these people called themselves, but all the ethnographic data on North American Indian cultures suggest that they identified themselves in terms of lineage and clan membership. [...] The English and Dutch were frustrated by this lack of structure because it made land purchase so difficult. Deeds, according to the European concept of property, had to be signed by identifiable owners with authority to sell and have specific boundaries on a map. The relatively amorphous leadership structure of the Long Island communities, the imprecise delineation of hunting ground boundaries, and their view of the land as a living entity to be used rather than owned made conventional European real estate deals nearly impossible to negotiate. The surviving primary records suggest that the Dutch and English remedied this situation by pressing cooperative local sachems to establish a  more structured political base in their communities and to define their communities as "tribes" with specific boundaries [...] The Montauk, under the leadership of Wyandanch in the  mid-seventeenth century, and the Matinnecock, under the sachems Suscaneman and  Tackapousha, do appear to have developed rather tenuous coalitions as a result of their contact with the English settlers."

"An early example of [European] intervention into Native American political institutions is a 1664 agreement wherein the East Hampton and Southampton officials appointed a sunk squaw named Quashawam to govern both the Shinnecock and the Montauk." 
William "Tangier" Smith held title to the entire island in the 17th century, under a royal patent from Thomas Dongan. The remnants of Smith's Manor of St. George are open to the public in Shirley, New York. "On May 25, 1691 Col. William "Tangier" Smith purchased from the Indian, John Mayhew the enormous acreage, later to be known as the Manor of St. George. He then set aside 175 acres of the land occupied by the Unkechaug Indians on the west side of the Mastic (Forge) River at Poosepatuck Creek to be theirs for the annual rent of two ears of corn. The Poosepatuck Indian Reservation is still in existence today, however it has shrunk to 55 acres due to unscrupulous land dealings by early officials."
 The first large house was built in 1795 in Cherry Grove by Jeremiah Smith. Smith was said to have lured ships to their doom and killed the crews.
 In the early 19th century when slavery in New York was still legal, slave runners built stockades on the island by the Fire Island Inlet.
 The first Fire Island Lighthouse was built in 1825 and was replaced by the current lighthouse in 1858.
 In 1855, David S. S. Sammis bought  near the Fire Island Lighthouse and built the Surf Hotel at what today is Kismet. Sammis operated the hotel until 1892, when the state took it over. In 1908, it became the first state park on Long Island.
 In 1868, Archer and Elizabeth Perkinson bought the land around Cherry Grove and Fire Island Pines. They built a hotel in 1880.
 In 1887, the Coast Guard established 11 staffed lifesaving stations on the island.
 In 1892, troops were called out to suppress a potential riot at Democrat Point over a cholera panic.
 In 1908, Ocean Beach was established, followed by Saltaire in 1910.
 In 1921, the Perkinsons sold the land around Cherry Grove in small lots. Bungalows from the newly closed Camp Upton in Yaphank were ferried over the Great South Bay to build the new community. Duffy's Hotel was built in 1930.
 The Great Hurricane of 1938 devastated much of the island and made it appear undesirable to many. However, Duffy's Hotel remained relatively undamaged. According to legend, the gay population began to concentrate in Cherry Grove at Duffy's Hotel with Christopher Isherwood and W. H. Auden dressed as Dionysus and Ganymede and carried aloft on a gilded litter by a group of singing followers. The gay influence was continued in the 1960s when male model John B. Whyte developed Fire Island Pines. The Pines currently has some of the most expensive property on the island and accounts for two-thirds of the island's swimming pools.
 In 1964, Robert Moses built the Captree Causeway to the western end of the island. Opponents, fearing that this was the beginning of plans for the continuation of Ocean Parkway, which would have run down the middle of the island, organized and eventually stopped the parkway.
 In September 1964, Lyndon Johnson signed a bill creating Fire Island National Seashore.

As gay village
The hamlets of Cherry Grove and Fire Island Pines together have constituted a gay village since the mid-20th century. The party-filled culture of the pre-HIV/AIDS 1970s is portrayed in Andrew Holleran's 1978 novel Dancer from the Dance. The Botel (today the Grove Hotel) was gay-friendly and ran popular afternoon "tea dances". Cherry Grove calls itself "America’s First Gay and Lesbian Town". Fire Island has "an iconic gay scene" and the Grove Hotel is the only hotel in New York State that prohibits those under 21 on the premises; this is legal because the hotel's entrance is through a bar.

2009: Beach renourishment 
A 2009 beach renourishment program was credited with saving the island from the full effects of Hurricane Sandy in 2012.

In the winter and spring of 2009, a beach renourishment project was undertaken on Fire Island, with the cooperation of the National Park Service, the U.S. Army Corps of Engineers, the Towns of Brookhaven and Islip, and Fire Island residents. The renourishment program involved dredging sand from an offshore borrow area, pumping it onto the beach and shaping the sand into an approved beach face and dune template in front of the communities of Corneille Estates, Davis Park, Dunewood, Fair Harbor, Fire Island Pines, Fire Island Summer Club, Lonelyville, Ocean Bay Park, Ocean Beach, Saltaire, and Seaview. Fire Islanders agreed to a significant property tax increase to help pay for the project, which was estimated to cost between $23 and $25 million ($6,020 per housing unit), including the cost of environmental monitoring, and was expected to add  of sand in front of the participating communities. The Towns of Brookhaven and Islip, in which the communities are located, issued bonds to pay for the project, backed by the new taxes levied by community Erosion Control Taxing Districts.

2012: Hurricane Sandy 
The island was heavily damaged in the high tides associated with Hurricane Sandy in 2012, including three breaches around Smith Point County Park on the sparsely populated eastern end of the island.  The biggest breach (and politically most difficult one to deal with because it is in a wilderness area) is at Old Inlet in the Otis Pike Wilderness Area just west of Smith Point County Park.  Old Inlet is at the site of previous breaches (which have come and gone on their own) and was 108 feet wide after the storm on the south end and 1,171 feet on February 28, 2013. Officials have been debating whether to close the breach and let nature take its course, as it has been flushing out the Great South Bay and improving water quality.  However, residents of the bay front communities noted increased flooding after the storm.  This flooding was later found to be the result of several nor'easters and unrelated to the breaches.  As of 2018, the breach remained open. Officials have moved to close the other two breaches which are on either side of Moriches Inlet—one in Cupsogue County Park and the other  being in Smith Point County Park.

Reports indicated that 80 percent of the homes, particularly those on the east end, were flooded, and 90 homes were completely destroyed.  The storm also tore away about 75 feet of the dune coastline.  But Fire Island was not hit as hard as other areas, with most of the 4,500 homes on the island surviving even if damaged, and significant home reconstruction has taken place. Officials credited the dune replenishment program with helping to spare the island.

Geography

It is separated from Long Island by the Great South Bay, which spans interconnected bays along Long Island: Patchogue Bay, Bellport Bay, Narrow Bay, and Moriches Bay. 

The island and its resort communities are accessible by boat, seaplane, and a number of ferries, which run across the bay from Patchogue, Bay Shore, and Sayville, to more than 10 points on the island. 

The island is accessible by automobile near each end: via Robert Moses Causeway on its western end, and by William Floyd Parkway (Suffolk County Road 46) near its eastern end. Motor vehicles are not permitted on the rest of the island, except for utility, construction and emergency access and with limited beach-driving permits in winter. 

Fire Island is located at 40°39′35″ north, 73°5′23″ west.

History of American cartography and international metrology 

In 1834, Ferdinand Rudolph Hassler, a Swiss-American surveyor, measured at Fire Island the first baseline of the Survey of the Coast, shortly before Louis Puissant declared, in 1836, to the French Academy of Sciences that Jean Baptiste Joseph Delambre and Pierre Méchain had made errors in the meridian arc measurement, which had been used for determining the length of the metre. Hassler had designed a baseline apparatus which instead of bringing different bars in actual contact during measurements, used only one bar calibrated on the metre and optical contact.

At that time in Europe, surveyors continued to use measuring instruments calibrated on the Toise of Peru. In 1840, Friedrich Wilhelm Bessel questioned the accuracy of three copies of this standard belonging to Altona and Koenigsberg Observatories, which he had compared to each other. Next year, Bessel proposed his ellipsoid of reference and a flattening of the Earth much closer to reality than that which had been used to compute the length of the metre from the arc measurement of Delambre and Méchain.

Geodesists were the first to demand the creation of an international institute for the comparison of length standards. According to Charles Édouard Guillaume, the consideration of a discrepancy between the Toise of Peru and the Toise of Bessel led the Central European Arc Measurement to consider, at its 1866 meeting in Neuchâtel, where Carlos Ibáñez e Ibáñez de Ibero proposed the participation of Spain to remeasure and extend the meridian arc of Paris, the foundation of a World institute for the comparison of geodetic standards, the first step towards the creation of the International Bureau of Weights and Measures.

Historical modifications
The physical attributes of the island have changed over time, and they continue to change.

Around 1683, Fire Island Inlet broke through, separating it from Jones Beach Island.

Fire Island separated from Southampton in a 1931 Nor'easter when Moriches Inlet broke through. However, this is expected. 
The inlet widened on September 21, 1938. Moriches Inlet and efforts by local communities east of Fire Island to protect their beach front with jetties have led to an interruption in the longshore drift of sand going from east to west and are blamed for erosion of the Fire Island beachfront. 
Between these major breaks there have been reports over the years of at least six inlets that broke through the island but have since disappeared.

Landmarks and preserves

Except for the western  of the island, the island is protected as part of Fire Island National Seashore. Robert Moses State Park, occupying the remaining western portion of the island, is one of the popular recreational destinations in the New York City area. The Fire Island Light stands just east of Robert Moses State Park.

A memorial to TWA 800, dedicated in June 2002, is located on the eastern end at Smith Point County Park near where the airplane crashed at sea.

Locations
Towns are listed below from west to east, communities within each town are listed alphabetically.

Town of Babylon
Fire Island Inlet
Robert Moses State Park (part)

Town of Islip

Atlantique
Corneille Estates
Dunewood
Fair Harbor
Fire Island Light
Fire Island Summer Club
Kismet
Lonelyville
Ocean Beach (village)
Robert Moses State Park (park)
Robbins Rest
Saltaire (village)
Seabay Beach
Seaview

Town of Brookhaven

Bellport Beach
Blue Point Beach
Cherry Grove
Davis Park/Ocean Ridge
Fire Island Pines
Moriches Inlet
Oakleyville
Ocean Bay Park
Otis Pike Fire Island High Dune Wilderness
Point O'Woods
Smith Point County Park
Sunken Forest
Talisman/Barrett Beach
Watch Hill, National Park Service facility in the central part of the island, including a public marina, camp ground visitor center, and nature trail
Water Island

Small islands in the vicinity
The following are associated islands in the Fire Island National Seashore Jurisdiction, from west to east:
Sexton Island, a small island across from the Fire Island Lighthouse with approximately 20 small, private, summer houses. There is no ferry service or electrical service.
West Fire Island, a small island with about a dozen houses. It has no telephone or electrical service.
East Fire Island, another longer and larger island next to West Fire Island. East Fire Island, unlike West Fire Island, is uninhabited. People are allowed, although there is no ferry service and the only way to get there is on your own boat.
Ridge Island
Pelican Island
John Boyle Island
Hospital Island

Other locations
Clam Pond, a small cove between Saltaire and Fair Harbor

Inhabitants

Fire Island's population varies seasonally. There are few residents in winter months, with the population rising in the late spring to early fall.

Housing is mostly stick-built bungalow-style with generous helpings of bamboo. Some are beachfront, built on the dunes of the Atlantic Ocean, while others are on boardwalks or concrete walks, like a miniaturized city. For year-round residents, there are schools, churches, shops and even a school bus service to the mainland of Long Island via an off-road modified school bus.

The quiet villages on Fire Island provide solitude, while the larger towns like Ocean Beach and Cherry Grove provide a more social atmosphere with clubs, bars and open air dining. Two of these hamlets, Fire Island Pines and Cherry Grove, are destinations for LGBT vacationers.

The incorporated villages of Ocean Beach and Saltaire within Fire Island National Seashore are car-free during the summer tourist season (Memorial Day through Labor Day) and permit only pedestrian and bicycle traffic (during certain hours only in Ocean Beach). For off-season use, there are a limited number of driving permits for year-round residents and contractors. The hamlet of Davis Park allows no vehicles or bicycles year-round.

In 1992 Diane Ketcham of The New York Times noted that due to the lack of retail, entertainment, and television options, especially in the winter, area children often felt boredom and therefore felt excited to attend school.

Demographics
As of the 2000 United States Census of 2000, there were 491 people, 138 households, and 77 families residing on Fire Island. The population density was 52.82/mi2 (21.82/km2). There were 4,153 housing units, at an average density of 478.1/mi2 (184.6/km2). The racial makeup of the town was 96.77% White, 0.65% Asian, 0.32% Pacific Islander, 0.65% from other races, and 1.61% from two or more races. Hispanic or Latino of any race were 2.90% of the population.

There were 138 households on Fire Island, out of which 25.4% had children under the age of 18 living with them, 48.6% were married couples living together, 2.2% had a female householder with no husband present, and 44.2% were non-families. 34.8% of all households were made up of individuals, and 10.1% had someone living alone who was 65 years of age or older. The average household size was 2.20 and the average family size was 2.90.

Fire Island's population was spread out, with 20.6% under the age of 18, 6.5% from 18 to 24, 29.0% from 25 to 44, 33.5% from 45 to 64, and 10.3% who were 65 years of age or older. The median age was 42 years. For every 100 females there were 133.1 males. For every 100 females age 18 and over, there were 143.6 males.

The median income for a household on Fire Island was $73,281, and the median income for a family was $83,672. Males had a median income of $46,875 versus $41,429 for females. The per capita income for Fire Island was $43,681. 0.0% of families and 3.1% of individuals were below the poverty line, including 0.0% of those under age 18 and 8.6% of those age 65 or over.

Famous summer residents
After the Manhattan theater community began staying on Fire Island during the 1920s, the island had numerous summer celebrity residents.
 Gary Beach, Tony award-winning actor
 Fanny Brice, actress, whose house in Ocean Beach is home to the OB Youth Group
 Mel Brooks wrote, with Carl Reiner, the "2000 Year Old Man" in their home on the beach.
 Barbara Corcoran, investor, TV personality
 Tina Fey, creator of 30 Rock, stays during the summer at Fair Harbor and Ocean Beach
 Henry Fonda, actor, built a summer home in the Pines.
 Wolcott Gibbs, theater critic of The New Yorker
 Samuel Adams Green, art dealer
 Joseph Heller
 Ring Lardner, Jr.
 John Lennon, of The Beatles; the piano he shipped to the island is currently at the Rock and Roll Hall of Fame in Cleveland, Ohio
 Joan McCracken, dancer, who spent much of her final years there
 Kevin Nash, professional wrestler
 Christopher Noth, known for his acting in Sex and the City and Law and Order, stays in Ocean Beach in the summer
 Frank O'Hara, writer, poet, art critic, curator at Museum of Modern Art; died after being struck by a dune buggy on Fire Island.
 Carl Reiner, writer, completed the first season of The Dick Van Dyke Show scripts while living on Fire Island
 Lea Thompson, Back to the Future star, and her director husband Howard Deutch
 Herman Wouk, writer, responsible for the construction of the Fire Island Synagogue in Seaview

Emergency services
Fire Island's unique location and constantly changing geography play a major role in the protection of its citizens. Although it is served by ten fire departments and two police departments, the seasonal residency and remote driving distance are a challenge to the public safety community. Because there are no roads on inhabited Fire Island, fire department vehicles are heavily modified four-wheel drive with suspension lifts, large diameter off-road tires and recovery equipment, which allow them to traverse the sometimes washed-out, loose sand.

Until 1986, there was no ambulance service on Fire Island, prompting the village of Saltaire to form its rescue company, later followed by Ocean Beach, and then in the 2000s with Fair Harbor. Due to relatively close distances, fire departments on Fire Island are obliged to provide mutual aid to neighboring communities. Some coastal fire departments on Long Island have fully equipped marine rescue and fire boat units which can cross the Great South Bay to provide necessary assistance.

Fire Island's corps of off-road-capable fire apparatus and the firefighters' training to use them effectively provide much-needed support in the event of a wildfire, as was illustrated in the Long Island Central Pine Barrens fires of 1995.

Good Samaritan Hospital Medical Center, Southside Hospital, and Brookhaven Memorial Hospital Medical Center are located directly across the Great South Bay from Fire Island in the Long Island hamlets of West Islip, Bay Shore, and the village of Patchogue, respectively. A heliport for medevac helicopter use is adjacent to Good Samaritan Hospital Medical Center. Specially equipped boats provided by the Suffolk County Police Department Marine Bureau docked at the various communities on Fire Island provide emergency transportation to individuals in need of dire medical care. In many cases, Long Island based ambulances will meet the boats once they cross the Bay (roughly 4.5 miles) and then drive individuals the short distance to one of the three hospitals. Also, one emergency access road connects Long Island (West Islip) to Fire Island (Kismet). However, the road ends there and does not extend the full length of the island into the other communities.

The Suffolk County Police Department Marine Bureau is the primary law enforcement agency. Ocean Beach also has a dedicated police department of its own. Criminal proceedings are handled by Suffolk District Court and subjects that are arrested will go to the 3rd, 1st or 5th precinct, or to one of the Suffolk County Sheriff's Office-run jails. Small claims and property matters are usually handled by the individual village of case origin. It is common practice for police to write tickets then send unruly visitors off the island via water taxi, at the offender's expense.

The Suffolk County Park Police and New York State Park Police patrol the Robert Moses State Park, while the National Park Service is stationed at the Fire Island Light and Fire Island National Seashore.

The United States Coast Guard has a base on Fire Island and provides aerial and nautical patrols to the Fire Island National Seashore as well as all beaches in the area. One of the oldest Coast Guard stations in America, Station #25 has been in uninterrupted operation since 1849.

Education
School districts that cover the island include:
 Fire Island Union Free School District which operates Woodhull School (PK-6)
 Students who graduate from Woodhull can choose to go to either the Bay Shore School District or the Islip School District for secondary levels. The respective high schools are Bay Shore High School and Islip High School.
 William Floyd Union Free School District
 Center Moriches Union Free School District
 East Moriches Union Free School District
 (for West Hampton Dunes) Remsenburg-Speonk Union Free School District

In popular culture

The 1955 novel Auntie Mame by Patrick Dennis uses a Fire Island reference to emphasize that the eponymous character keeps "queer" company.
The August 1965 feature "Shel Silverstein on Fire Island" appeared in Playboy magazine, with humorous quips about the gay club scene there.
The 1969 film Last Summer by Frank Perry, adapted by Eleanor Perry from the Evan Hunter novel about a summer of sexual discovery on Fire Island, brought an Oscar nomination for actress Catherine Burns.
The pioneering 1971 gay pornographic film Boys in the Sand by Wakefield Poole was filmed on Fire Island.
American writer Patricia Nell Warren locates parts of her 1974 best-selling novel The Front Runner on the Island, as well as parts of the 1994 sequel Harlan's Race.
The 1975 Brian Eno album Another Green World features the song "Over Fire Island".
The Village People included a song titled "Fire Island" on their 1977 debut album; the song refers to the island as "a funky weekend" and mention several locations on the island such as the Ice Palace, the Monster, the Blue Whale, and the Sandpiper.
Rob Halford, lead singer of the heavy metal band Judas Priest, sings about a visit to a leather bar on "New York's Fire Island" in the song "Raw Deal" on the 1977 release Sin After Sin.
The song "Come to Me" has been described as "the definitive Fire Island dance classic" because of the legendary July 7, 1979, Fire Island concert performance by 16-year-old France Joli for an oceanfront audience of 5,000 (after Donna Summer cancelled at the last minute, Joli stepped in as a replacement and became an overnight sensation).
The 1980 teen novel My First Love and Other Disasters by Francine Pascal takes place largely on Fire Island, where the protagonist, Victoria Martin, is working as a mother's helper. (Francine Pascal: Dell, 1980)
Fire Island is the setting of the 1991 Terrence McNally play Lips Together, Teeth Apart.
The song "Pretty Deep" on the 1997 album Lovesongs for Underdogs by Tanya Donelly refers to a visit to Fire Island.
Fire Island is repeatedly referenced on the NBC sitcom Will & Grace, first broadcast in 1998.
When Ocean Meets Sky, a 2003 documentary detailing the 50-year history of the Fire Island Pines community, includes much previously unseen archival footage.
The 2003 album Welcome Interstate Managers by Fountains of Wayne featured the song "Fire Island" about two siblings' home-alone shenanigans while their parents vacation on the island.
The song "Gay Messiah" on the 2004 album Want Two by Rufus Wainwright makes a reference to the popularity of Fire Island for gay and lesbian tourists, remarking that when the "gay messiah" comes, "He will fall from the star / of Studio 54 / and appear on the sand / of Fire Island's shore".
Fire Island serves dual meanings as both a vacation destination and a homoerotic euphemism in the 2004 book Dress Your Family in Corduroy and Denim by David Sedaris.
The mockumentary Beach Comber was filmed on Fire Island in 2004.
The 2006 ABC reality show One Ocean View was shot on Fire Island.
Fire Island is featured prominently in the 2008 Ann Brashares novel The Last Summer (of You and Me), about two sisters and a friend who grow up together, vacationing on the island every summer.
The 2019 mystery film Last Ferry features a gay tourist visiting the Fire Island in search of fun and adventure, who arrives during the off-season.
The 2022 rom-com Fire Island features a group of gay friends on a weeklong vacation to the locale.
On the show American Horror Story in season 11 'NYC' gay people often take a trip to Fire Island to escape the city.

See also
 Fire Island Inlet Bridge
 Jones Beach Island

References

External links

 
 Fire Island National Seashore

Babylon (town), New York
Brookhaven, New York
Populated coastal places in New York (state)
National Seashores of the United States
 
Islip (town), New York
Beaches of Suffolk County, New York
Car-free zones in the United States
Islands of Suffolk County, New York
Census-designated places in Suffolk County, New York
Barrier islands of New York (state)